Grinde may refer to:

Places
Grinde, Rogaland, a village in Tysvær municipality in Rogaland county, Norway
Grinde, Vestland, a village in Sogndal municipality in Vestland county, Norway

Geography
Grinde (landform), a type of treeless, wet heathland in the Black Forest of Germany

People
Bjørn Grinde, a biologist working in the fields of genetics and evolution
Nick Grinde (1893-1979), an American film director and screenwriter
Wanda Grinde, an American politician with the Democratic Party of Montana
Åslaug Grinde (born 1931), a Norwegian politician for the Liberal Party